The following people have served as principals or presidents of Brigham Young University-Idaho, also known as the Bannock Stake Academy (1888–1903), Ricks Academy (1903–17), Ricks Normal College (1917–23), and Ricks College (1923–2000).

References 

BYU-Idaho past presidents

 
Brigham Young-Idaho